De'Mon Brooks (born May 28, 1992) is an American basketball player who plays for Levanga Hokkaido of the Japanese B.League. He completed his college career at Davidson College after the 2013–14 season.  In the 2011–12 NCAA Division I men's basketball season, he was named Southern Conference player of the year and an All-American by the Associated Press.

High school career
Brooks, a 6'7" forward born in the U. S. state of Georgia, played high school basketball at Hopewell High School in Huntersville, North Carolina. As a senior, he averaged 20 points and 10.2 rebounds per game for his school.

College career
He committed to coach Bob McKillop at Davidson and started his college career in the 2010–11 season.  That year, he averaged 9.0 points and 5.1 rebounds per game and was named a freshman All-American by Collegeinsider.com.  As a sophomore, Brooks increased his output to 15.7 points and 6.2 rebounds and led the team to regular season and tournament championships in the Southern Conference.

In the 2012 Southern Conference tournament, Brooks scored 19 points in the Wildcats' double overtime championship game win and was named tournament MVP.  At the conclusion of the season, Brooks was named Southern Conference Player of the Year by the league's coaches (his teammate, Jake Cohen won the same award from the league's media – the first time two players from the same school split the honor).  He was also named an honorable mention by the Associated Press.

Brooks returned to Davidson for his junior year in 2012–13 and was named the preseason conference player of the year. In four season with the Wildcats, Brooks appeared in 125 games averaging 14.2 points per game and 6.1 rebounds per game.

Professional career
On July 2, 2014, Brooks was named to the Charlotte Hornets summer league team.  On July 11 he signed with Azzurro Napoli in Italy.

On February 11, 2015, he signed with Hapoel Gilboa Galil of the Israeli Basketball Premier League. Brooks played for Medi Bayreuth from 2016 to 2019. He averaged 12.2 points and 5 rebounds per game during the 2018–19 season. Brooks parted ways with the team on May 28, 2019. He spent the 2019–20 season with Ryukyu Golden Kings in Japan, averaging 16.9 points, 5.2 rebounds and 2 assists per game. On June 25, 2020, Brooks signed with Shimane Susanoo Magic.

References
 https://germanhoops.com/2018/11/09/could-demon-brooks-be-medi-bayreuths-version-of-a-lifer-like-a-quantez-robertson-or-rickey-paulding/

External links
Davidson Wildcats bio

1992 births
Living people
American expatriate basketball people in Germany
American expatriate basketball people in Israel
American expatriate basketball people in Italy
American expatriate basketball people in Japan
American men's basketball players
Basketball players from Georgia (U.S. state)
Davidson Wildcats men's basketball players
Hapoel Gilboa Galil Elyon players
Medi Bayreuth players
Power forwards (basketball)
Ryukyu Golden Kings players
Basketball players from Charlotte, North Carolina